Kim Todd (born April 15, 1970) is an American author. She is also a professor of creative writing at the University of Minnesota. She has written essays and several books of nonfiction, primarily about environmental history and the natural sciences.

Education and work

Todd received her master's in environmental studies and her M.F.A. in creative writing from the University of Montana in Missoula.

Todd is the recipient of a PEN/Jerard Fund award. Her book Tinkering with Eden won the 2001 Sigurd Olson Nature Writing Award. Her book Chrysalis was selected by the New York Public Library as a "Book to Remember." Her work has been reviewed in The New Yorker, The New York Times, and The New York Review of Books.

Bibliography

Books

 Tinkering with Eden, A Natural History of Exotic Species in America (2001) .
 Chrysalis, Maria Sibylla Merian and the Secrets of Metamorphosis (2007) (See Maria Sibylla Merian.)
 Sparrow (2012) Reaktion Books. .
 Sensational: The Hidden History of America's 'Girl Stunt Reporters''', HarperCollins, New York, 2021. 

Essays and articles

 "Curious." River Teeth (2014)
 "Road Warrior." River Teeth (2015)
 "Reintroductions and Other Translocations." Guernica (2015)
 "Real predators don’t eat popsicles." High Country News (2016)
 "The Language of Sparrows: How Bird Songs Are Evolving To Compete With Urban Noise." Bay Nature (2016)
 "These Women Reporters Went Undercover to Get the Most Important Scoops of Their Day." Smithsonian (2016)
 "The Children’s Hour, Theatre Rhinoceros, 1986." Guernica (2017)
 "The Island Wolves." Orion (2017)
 "Coyote Tracker: San Francisco's Uneasy Embrace of a Predator's Return." Bay Nature (2018)
 "In Turn Each Woman Thrust Her Head." Paris Review Daily'' (2018)

References 

1970 births
Living people
21st-century American women writers
University of Minnesota faculty
University of Montana faculty
University of Montana alumni
American women academics